Cheshmeh Darreh (also Romanized as Cheshmeh Darreh and Cheshmeh-ye Darreh) is a village in Sepiddasht Rural District, Papi District, Khorramabad County, Lorestan Province, Iran. At the 2006 census, its population was 160, in 24 families.

References 

Towns and villages in Khorramabad County